This is a list of stations on the Valley Lines urban rail system, serving Cardiff, the capital of Wales, and surrounding commuter towns listed by local authority area.

Cardiff

Cardiff Queen Street (Caerdydd Heol Y Frenhines)
Cardiff Central (Caerdydd Canolog)
Cardiff Bay (Bae Caerdydd)
Ninian Park (Parc Ninian)
Waun-Gron Park (Parc Waun-Gron)
Fairwater (Tyllgoed)
Danescourt
Radyr
Heath Low Level (Lefel Isel y Mynydd Bychan)
Tŷ Glas
Birchgrove (Llwynbedw)
Rhiwbina
Whitchurch (Yr Eglwys Newydd)
Coryton
Cathays
Llandaff (Llandaf)
Taffs Well (Ffynon Taf)
Heath High Level (Lefel Uchal y Mynydd Bychan)
Llanishen
Lisvane & Thornhill (Llys-faen)
Grangetown

Rhondda Cynon Taff
Treforest Estate (Ystad Trefforest)
Treforest (Trefforest)

Mountain Ash (Aberpennar)
Fernhill
Cwmbach
Aberdare (Aberdâr)
Abercynon (Abercynon)
Trehafod
Porth
Dinas Rhondda
Tonypandy
Llwynypia
Ystrad Rhondda
Ton Pentre
Treorchy
Ynyswen
Treherbert
Pontyclun
Llanharan

Merthyr Tydfil
Quakers Yard (Mynwent-y-Crynwyr)
Merthyr Vale (Ynysowen)
Troed-y-rhiw<
Pentre-bach
Merthyr Tydfil (Merthyr Tudfil)

Caerphilly
Caerphilly (Caerffili)
Aber
Llanbradach
Ystrad Mynach
Hengoed
Pengam
Gilfach Fargoed
Bargoed
Brithdir
Tir-Phil
Pontlottyn (Pontlotyn)
Rhymney (Rhymni)

Vale Of Glamorgan
Dingle Road (Heol Dingle)
Penarth
Cogan
Eastbrook
Dinas Powys
Cadoxton (Tregatwg)
Barry Docks (Dociau'r Barri)
Barry (Y Barri)
Barry Island (Ynys Y Barri)
Rhoose Cardiff International Airport (Y Rhws Maes Awyr Rhyngwladol Caerdydd)
Llantwit Major (Llanilltud Fawr)

Bridgend
Pencoed
Bridgend (Pen-Y-Bont)
Wildmill (Melin Wyllt)
Sarn
Tondu
Garth
Maesteg (Ewenny Road) (Maesteg Heol Ewenni)
Maesteg

Transport in Cardiff
 Valley Lines stations
Lists of railway stations in Great Britain
Cardiff-related lists